Dr. Lajos Kupcsok (born 1961) is a Hungarian jurist and politician, member of the National Assembly (MP) from Fidesz Pest County Regional List from 2010 to 2014. In 2014, he was appointed President of the Chamber of Commerce in Pest County.

Kupcsok was a member of the Economic and Information Technology Committee between May 14, 2010 and May 5, 2014.

Personal life
He is married and has two children.

References

1961 births
Living people
Hungarian jurists
Members of the National Assembly of Hungary (2010–2014)
People from Ózd